Nikola "Peco" Rakojević (born 15 January 1958) is a Montenegrin football manager and former player.

Playing career
A one-club man, Rakojević played for Sutjeska Nikšić over the course of 14 seasons between 1975 and 1989, making over 250 appearances in the Yugoslav First League and Second League combined.

Managerial career
During his managerial career, Rakojević worked at numerous clubs, mainly in Montenegro and Serbia, but also in Bosnia and Herzegovina. He served as manager of Sutjeska Nikšić, Rudar Pljevlja, Hajduk Kula, Vrbas, Budućnost Podgorica, Zeta (2001–2003), Borac Banja Luka (2003–04), Čukarički (2004–05), Budućnost Banatski Dvor (2005–06), Banat Zrenjanin (2006–07), Lovćen (2007–08), Sutjeska Nikšić (2008–2010), Budućnost Podgorica (Jun–Dec 2010), Sutjeska Nikšić (Jan–Apr 2011), Čelik Nikšić (2011), Rudar Pljevlja (2012–13), and Mladost Podgorica (Jun–Oct 2013).

At international level, Rakojević led the FR Yugoslavia U21s during the UEFA European Under-21 Championship 2002 qualifying stage.

Honours
Mladost Podgorica
 Montenegrin First League: 2015–16
Sutjeska Nikšić
 Montenegrin First League: 2017–18, 2018–19
 Montenegrin Cup: 2016–17

References

External links
 

1958 births
Living people
Footballers from Nikšić
Yugoslav footballers
Montenegrin footballers
Association football midfielders
FK Sutjeska Nikšić players
Yugoslav Second League players
Yugoslav First League players
Serbia and Montenegro football managers
Montenegrin football managers
FK Sutjeska Nikšić managers
FK Rudar Pljevlja managers
FK Hajduk Kula managers
FK Vrbas managers
FK Budućnost Podgorica managers
FK Zeta managers
FK Borac Banja Luka managers
FK Čukarički managers
FK Banat Zrenjanin managers
FK Lovćen managers
OFK Titograd managers
OFK Petrovac managers
Premier League of Bosnia and Herzegovina managers
Serbian SuperLiga managers